Thais (1893–1898) was a British Thoroughbred racehorse and broodmare. She showed very promising form as a juvenile in 1895 when she was placed in the New Stakes and the July Stakes before winning the Crabbet Plate at Gatwick. In the following year she won the 1000 Guineas and finished second in both the Epsom Oaks and the Coronation Stakes before being retired at the end of the season. She had no chance to prove her worth as a broodmare, dying at the age of five without producing a foal.

Background
Thais was a bay mare bred by her owner the Prince of Wales. She was sent into training with Richard Marsh at Egerton House in Newmarket, Suffolk. She was described as a "delicate and highly-strung" filly.

She was sired by St Serf who won the Rous Memorial Stakes and went on to sire several other good horses included the St Leger winner Challacombe. Her dam Poetry, a half-sister to the St Leger winner Ossian, was bred by the Duke of Devonshire and bought by the Prince of Wales for 430 guineas.

Racing career

1895: two-year-old season
At Royal Ascot on 20 June Thais started at odds of 11/4 for the New Stakes over five and a half furlongs. Ridden by T J Calder she finished third, beaten a head and two lengths by Roquebrune and Shaddock. In the July Stakes at Newmarket Racecourse she was made 2/1 favourite but finished a close third to the colts Galeazzo and Labrador. On 24 July, with Calder in the saddle, the filly recorded her first success when she won the £1000 Crabbet Plate over five furlongs at Gatwick Racecourse.

1896: three-year-old season

On 1 May Thais was one of 19 fillies to contest the 83rd running of the 1000 Guineas over the Rowley Mile at Newmarket and was made the 5/1 second favourite behind Omladina, a filly who had divided St Frusquin and Persimmon when running second in the Middle Park Plate. The best-fancied of the others were Lord Zetland's Jolly Boat, Douglas Baird's Santa Maura and the unnamed "sister to Ella Tweed". Ridden by John Watts, Thais took the lead a furlong out and won an "exciting race" by a neck from Santa Maura, with Jolly Boat three quarters of a length away in third place. As Thais and Santa Maura were racing on opposite sides of the wide course the finish was difficult to judge and many observers believed that the latter had won. The Royal victory was reportedly greeted by "cheers of the heartiest sort".

At Epsom Racecourse on 5 June Thais started 13/8 favourite against ten opponents for the Oaks Stakes over one and a half miles. With Watts again in the saddle she looked the likely winner in the straight but was overtaken in the last quarter mile and was beaten two lengths into second place by Lord Derby's Canterbury Pilgrim. Richard Marsh explained his trainee's defeat by stating that the filly had refused to eat since leaving Newmarket and was "quite off-colour". In the Coronation Stakes over one mile at Royal Ascot later that month Thais finished in front of Canterbury Pilgrim but was beaten into second place by the Duke of Westminster's Helm, to whom she was conceding seven pounds.

On 28 October, carrying a weight of 112 pounds, Thais finished unplaced behind Winkfield's Pride in the Cambridgeshire Handicap at Newmarket.

Breeding record
At the end of the 1896 season Thais was retired to become a broodmare at the Royal stud at Sandringham. She was barren when mated to Isinglass in 1897 and died in November 1898 of inflammation of the bowels before producing any offspring.

Pedigree

References

1893 racehorse births
1898 racehorse deaths
Racehorses bred in the United Kingdom
Racehorses trained in the United Kingdom
Thoroughbred family 23-a
1000 Guineas winners